Vikram is a 1986 Indian Tamil-language action spy film directed by Rajasekhar and stars Kamal Haasan, Sathyaraj, Amjad Khan, Lissy, Dimple Kapadia, Charuhasan and Janagaraj. This is the first Indian film to use computer for recording the songs and was adapted from a novel of same name written by Sujatha. This was the Malayalam film actress Lissy's Tamil debut who was initially credited as Preethi as well as the Hindi film actress Kapadia's Tamil debut. 

Although the film received mixed reviews, it performed very well at the box office and turned out to be a commercially successful venture for Raaj Kamal Films International. A spiritual successor with the same name was released on 3 June 2022, carrying forward the story with Haasan reprising his role of the title character.

Plot 
On 15 March, Ashraf Hussain, Francis Adaikalaraj, RD Bohra are convicted and sentenced to 25 years' imprisonment for their involvement in various anti-national activities. Being unremorseful, the convicts play Chinese Chequers while the judge sentences them. Approaching the escort van, one of the convicts boisterously rebukes boasts to the press of becoming free soon. The next day, a nuclear-capable ICBM, Agni Putra, is being dispatched from an unknown location to Satish Dhawan Space Centre, Sriharikota only to be stolen by Sugirtharaja and his henchmen. 

Back in Headquarters, a visibly distraught panel of ministers and military top brass, led by Mr. Rao, chief of the RAW mulls over the dangerous prospects of the missile falling into terrorists' hands and finally picks the now off-duty agent, Commander Arun Kumar Vikram aka Vikram to locate the Agni Putra, with some resentment. The Secretary in the office, Thangaraj, eavesdrop on the mission briefing and passes the information to Sugirtharaja about Vikram, who sends a henchman to kill him. The plan fails as Vikram's three-month-pregnant wife, Ambika, accidentally gets shot by the sniper.

Enraged, Vikram returns to duty and rebukes Rao for the costly leak and deftly exposes Thangaraj. After torture, Thangaraj names Sugirtharaja as the mastermind in front of the panel, and jumps to his death without giving further details. Desperate to find the missile, which is designed to auto-ignite within 10 days, Rao introduces Vikram to a computer expert Preethi, who knows the design of Agni Putra's on-board computer and its functions. Initially annoyed with Vikram's brutal ways, she mellows down eventually. Sugirtharaja's henchman destroys all the evidence at Thangaraj's home, before Vikram and Preethi arrive. 

The ensuing chase ends at a cinema theatre, playing a documentary news reel about India-Salamia friendship, where Vikram spots Sugirtharaja. Upon investigation, Vikram realises that the Kingdom of Salamia discourages intel-sharing with India. With the diplomatic route ruled out, Vikram and Preethi, disguising as folk artists, embark along with a troupe to Salamia, ruled by Sultan. Being saved from a snakebite by Vikram, Salamia's princess and Sultan's sister, Inimaasi falls for him. Though Preethi is constantly put off by Vikram's arrogance, she falls for him too.

Vikram identifies the location of the missile and also discovers that the high priest is a mere puppet under Sugirtharaja's directions, who secretly reprograms the missile, while Preethi is caught by the guards. Preethi, then siding with Sugirtharaja, pretends to be cheated by Vikram and passes information to him, unbeknownst to Sugirtharaja. While trying to reprogram the on-board computer, he loses the information and inadvertently forays into a spa, where he meets Inimaasi. His attempts to expose the priest's treason are met with sheer dissent. The Sultan catches the couple, suspecting fornication, and sentences Vikram to be decapitated in public. 

Escaping execution, Vikram flees towards the desert, where a gun-toting Sugirtharaja and the Royal Sentries chase him until he gives in to dehydration and is left to die, when he is bitten by a black cobra. Back at the Royal Palace, the high priest stages a coup and holds the Sultan at gunpoint. Meanwhile, Inimaasi manages to escape and finds the delirious Vikram in the desert, and nurses him back. The couple then return to the palace and fight off the armed sentries, while the Sultan impales the high priest. Sugirtharaja, oblivious to the fact that Agni Putra's on-board computer has been tweaked, launches it, hoping to decimate New Delhi. 

At HQ, the Indian officials observe in despair as their computer screen shows a 2D animation of Agni Putra slowly descending upon New Delhi, only for the missile to later drift and plunge into the Bay of Bengal, disarming automatically. Back in Salamia, the royal guards sabotage the siege and restore order. A disillusioned Sugirtharaja forces Preethi into a glider plane and takes off. Vikram manages to board the plane using a lasso through skids. 

While scuffling, Sugirtharaja sets-off a bomb and jumps with the only parachute backpack available, strapped-on. As the plane explodes, Vikram and Preethi jump-off in a free fall and reach out to Sugirtharaja and grab his parachute, leading to his eventual death, through free fall. Afterwards, Vikram and Preethi get intimate mid-air and as they touch the ground, Inimaasi arrives, calling out to Vikram. Preethi, too, calls him. In a dilemma, Vikram frivolously runs away from both of them.

Cast 
 Kamal Haasan as Commander Arun Kumar Vikram aka A. K. Vikram, a ruthless and intelligent RAW agent
 Sathyaraj as Sugirtharaja
 Lissy as Preethi, a computer expert and IIT Madras graduate in Computer engineering (voiceover by Raadhika Sarathkumar)
 Dimple Kapadia as Inimaasi, Princess and sister of Sultan, Kingdom of Salamia.
 Amjad Khan as the Sultan, Kingdom of Salamia, a fictional kingdom (presumably in Central Asia)
 Charuhasan as Mr. Rao, chief of Research and Analysis Wing
 Janagaraj as Dubash-Tamil translator in Salamia
 Manorama as Pallathor Ramadevi, Consort of Sultan, Kingdom of Salamia
 Vikram Dharma as sniper (Sugirtharaja's henchman)
 V. K. Ramasamy as Minister
 T. S. Raghavendra as Thangaraj, secretary at Research and Analysis Wing office
 Prathapachandran as Police officer
 R. S. Shivaji as Bohra, Sugirtharaja's henchman
 L. Raja as Hussain, Sugirtharaja's henchman
Banerjee as Francis, Sugirtharaja's henchman
 Ambika as Vikram's wife (cameo appearance)

Production 
Vikram was the second production venture of Kamal Haasan's Raaj Kamal Films International, after Rajapaarvai.

On multiple occasions, Kamal Haasan has mentioned that during the story discussion and pre-production of Vikram, Mani Ratnam was his first choice to direct this film. However, things did not work out due to the fact that Mani was an untested director at that point of time, in terms of big budgeted commercial films. Haasan revealed that the language was actually created by him and Sujatha. The Salamia scenes were filmed in Rajasthan. The makers have hired 125 camels and 65 horses for the film. Other filming locations were Jaisalmer Palace and rat temple situated at Deshnok near Bikaner. Charuhasan's character was inspired by M from the James Bond series.

Soundtrack 
The soundtrack was composed by Ilaiyaraaja. A total of five songs were composed out of which four were included in the soundtrack. This is the first Indian soundtrack album recorded through computer.

Release and reception 
Vikram was released on 29 May 1986. Jayamanmadhan of Kalki wrote despite the script having glaring loopholes it can be forgiven however felt when the film shifts to Salamia, the second quarter of the film moves at a camel's pace. He concluded the review saying fine this film was talked about but the question is whether the film is a talking point is a question. According to Haasan, Vikram was unfavourably reviewed by film critics, but became a "commercial hit". Haasan donated the proceeds of the film's first show to UNICEF, who were then collecting funds for the welfare of underprivileged children in African continent.

Legacy 

36 years later, Kamal Haasan reprised his role of Agent Vikram in the 2022 film of the same name written and directed by Lokesh Kanagaraj (a fan of Kamal Haasan and who was born in 1986).

Future 

The 2022 film is the second instalment of the LCU after Kaithi. Two sequels are in development.

References

External links 
 

1980s action adventure films
1980s spy films
1980s Tamil-language films
1986 films
Fictional-language films
Films about nuclear war and weapons
Films about the Research and Analysis Wing
Films based on Indian novels
Films directed by Rajasekhar (director)
Films scored by Ilaiyaraaja
Films set in 1984
Films set in Asia
Films with screenplays by Kamal Haasan
Indian action adventure films
Indian detective films
Indian science fiction films
Indian Space Research Organisation in fiction
Indian spy action films
Intelligence Bureau (India) in fiction